Impermanence is the twelfth album by Meredith Monk, released on March 18, 2008 through ECM New Series.

Track listing

Personnel 
Musicians
Theo Bleckmann – vocals
Sasha Bogdanowitsch – vocals
Ellen Fisher – piano, vocals
Katie Geissinger – piano, vocals
Ching Gonzalez – piano, vocals
Bohdan Hilash – aulos, bamboo flute, bass clarinet, drums, double ocarina, piano, soprano saxophone, woodwind, zafoon
John Hollenbeck – Angklung, glockenspiel, marimba, percussion, piano, vibraphone
Silvie Jensen – vocals
Meredith Monk – piano, vocals
Allison Sniffin – piano, violin, vocals
Production
Manfred Eicher – production
Sascha Kleis – design
James A. Farber – engineering
John Sanchez – photography

References 

2008 albums
Albums produced by Manfred Eicher
ECM New Series albums
Meredith Monk albums